Plechotice is a village and municipality in the Trebišov District in the Košice Region of south-eastern Slovakia.

Etymology
The name comes from the Slovak plechota—a land without vegetation. 1332 Pellechte.

History
In historical records the village was first mentioned in 1324.

Geography
It has a population of about 775 people.

Ethnicity
The village is about 99% Slovak.

Facilities
The village has a public library and a football pitch

References

External links
http://www.statistics.sk/mosmis/eng/run.html

Villages and municipalities in Trebišov District